Harold Minkley (6 February 1907 – 29 June 2005) was a South African cricketer. He played in three first-class matches from 1935/36 to 1950/51.

References

External links
 

1907 births
2005 deaths
South African cricketers
Border cricketers
Eastern Province cricketers
Sportspeople from Qonce